Appaloosa Management is an American hedge fund founded in 1993 by David Tepper and Jack Walton specializing in distressed debt. Appaloosa Management invests in public equity and fixed income markets around the world.

History
In 1993, David Tepper and Jack Walton,  founded Appaloosa Management, an employee-owned hedge fund, in Chatham, New Jersey. Throughout the 1990s, the firm was known as a junk bond investment boutique, and through the 2000s it was known as a hedge fund. In March 2021, David Tepper said it's increasingly difficult to be bearish on stock rights now, feeling that rising rates are set to stabilize, and that the sell off in treasuries that has driven rates up is probably over.

2002 Conseco & Marconi Corp.
In the fourth quarter of 2002, Appaloosa Management returns were heavily a result of junk-bond and distressed debt bets in Conseco and Marconi Corp. that the market was bottoming out.

2007 Delphi
Assets under management in 2007 were $5.3 billion. The Financial Times reports the company has "attracted interest for its large ownership position in Delphi, the bankrupt car parts supplier, and its clashes on whether management has the shareholders best interests in mind or those of GM and the UAW."

2008 financial crisis through 2011
Appaloosa survived the financial crisis of 2008 with relatively few investor redemption orders.

From 2009 to 2010, Appaloosa Management's assets under management grew from $5 billion to $12 billion.

In November 2010, the New York Times reported total assets under management of $14 billion. In 2010, it was reported that since 1993 Appaloosa Management had returned $12.4 billion to clients—ranking it sixth on a ranking of total returns to clients by managers since inception.

In September 2011, a Delaware bankruptcy court found that Appaloosa Management is one of four hedge funds that had played a role in Washington Mutual’s restructuring which might have received confidential information that could have been used to trade improperly in the bank’s debt.  In 2011, the company was awarded the Institutional Hedge Fund Firm of the Year award.

In January 2016, Appaloosa's headquarters were relocated to Miami Beach, Florida.

Investment strategy
Appaloosa Management's investments focus on undiversified concentrated investment positions. Appaloosa invests in the global public equity and fixed income markets with a focus on "equities and debt of distressed companies, bonds, exchange warrants, options, futures, notes, and junk bonds." According to BusinessWeek, the firm's client base consists of high-net-worth individuals, pension and profit sharing plans, corporations, foreign governments, foundations, universities, and other organizations." Investors commit to a locked period of three years during which their withdrawals are limited to 25 percent of their total investment.

Products and performance
Appaloosa Management manages four investment vehicles: the offshore Palomino Fund LTD, an offshore and onshore version of its Thoroughbred fund, and its flagship fund Appaloosa Investment. A complete list of current holdings can be found here.

Palomino Fund
The Palomino Fund from its inception in 1995 to 1998 had a 25 percent return.  After Russia defaulted, the fund lost 49 percent of its value between February to September 1998. The fund returned  –26.7% percent in 2008 and 117.3 percent in 2009.  The company was ranked by Bloomberg Markets as the top performing fund of any hedge fund manager managing over one billion dollars.

Appaloosa Investment I
In 2001, the fund was up 67 percent followed the next year losing 25 percent. In 2003 the fund saw 149 percent returns for investors.

Administration
The company leaders include: 
 David Tepper, Founder and President,
 Michael L. Palmer, Chief Financial Officer, 
 Jeffrey L. Kaplan, Chief Operating Officer.

References

Financial services companies established in 1993
Hedge fund firms of the United States
Investment management companies of the United States
Hedge funds